Bruce Jay Wasserstein (December 25, 1947 – October 14, 2009) was an American investment banker, businessman, and writer. He was a graduate of the McBurney School, University of Michigan, Harvard Business School, and Harvard Law School, and spent a year at the University of Cambridge. He was prominent in the mergers and acquisitions industry, credited with working on 1,000 transactions with a total value of approximately $250 billion.

Early life
Wasserstein was born and raised in Midwood, Brooklyn, New York, the son of Lola (née Schleifer) and Morris Wasserstein. His father, a Jewish immigrant from pre-World War II Poland, emigrated to New York City and started a ribbon company. His maternal grandfather was Simon Schleifer, a Jewish teacher in the yeshiva in Wloclawek, Poland who later emigrated to Paterson, New Jersey and became a Hebrew school principal.

Wasserstein had four siblings: businesswoman Sandra Wasserstein Meyer; Pulitzer Prize-winning playwright Wendy Wasserstein (whose daughter, Lucy Jane, he was raising at the time of his death); Abner Wasserstein (died 2011); and Georgette Levis (died 2014), who was married to psychiatrist Albert J. Levis.

Wasserstein attended the Yeshiva of Flatbush for high school.

Career
Starting his career as an attorney at Cravath, Swaine & Moore, Wasserstein then moved to First Boston Corp. in 1977 and eventually rose to co-head of that company's then-dominant merger and acquisition practice. In 1988, with colleague Joseph Perella, he left First Boston to form investment bank boutique Wasserstein Perella & Co., which he sold in 2000, at the top of the late 1990s bull market, to Germany's Dresdner Bank for around $1.4 billion in stock. In 2002, he left the unit Dresdner Kleinwort Wasserstein (formed by merging Dresdner's United Kingdom unit Kleinwort Benson with Wasserstein Perella) to become head of the financial services firm Lazard. In 2005, he led the initial public offering of Lazard and became the public firm's first chairman and CEO.

Wasserstein controlled Wasserstein & Co., a private equity firm with investments in a number of industries, particularly media. In 2004, he added New York Magazine to his media empire. In July 2007, he sold American Lawyer Media to Incisive Media for about $630 million in cash. He was credited with the term "Pac-Man defense",  which is used by targeted companies during a hostile takeover attempt.

Philanthropy
In 2007 Wasserstein made a $25 million donation to Harvard Law School, for the creation of a large academic wing of the school's Northwest Corner complex, which was named Wasserstein Hall.

Net worth
According to Forbes, as of September 17, 2008, Wasserstein's net worth was estimated to be $2.3 billion.

As of 2008 he owned an apartment at 927 Fifth Avenue in New York City, an estate in Santa Barbara in California, an Atlantic oceanfront estate in East Hampton (Long Island), a house at 38 Belgrave Square in London, and another apartment in Paris.

Personal life
Wasserstein was married four times and has seven biological children:
Laura Lynelle Killin (married 1968, divorced 1974).
Christine Parrott (divorced 1992). They had three children: Ben, Pam and Scoop. Christine is a psychoanalyst and has since remarried to American journalist and newspaper publisher Dan Rattiner.
Claude Becker (married 1996, divorced 2008). They had two sons: Jack and Dash. Prior to her marriage to Wasserstein, Claude was an Emmy Award-winning CBS news producer. After Bruce's death Claude took in Lucy, his sister Wendy's daughter.
Angela Chao (married 2009, up until Wasserstein's death). She is the sister of Elaine Chao, who is married to U.S. Senator Mitch McConnell.

Wasserstein had two more children, Sky & Rose Wasserstein, with Erin McCarthy after separating from Becker; McCarthy, a Columbia MBA graduate, was formerly a director of development at Columbia University's Graduate School of Journalism. Both Sky and Rose were conceived via IVF. Sky was born at New York Hospital in 2008 while Rose (an embryo cryogenically frozen in 2007) was not born until 2016. Wasserstein gave Sky her the middle name Wendy, in memory of his sister, who had died in 2006. Sky is equal beneficiary in trusts Bruce had established for all his children that held his legacy assets, including several real estate properties and businesses, such as New York Magazine. Wasserstein and McCarthy shared joint custody of their daughter.  Upon Wasserstein's death, trustees for the various family trusts barred Sky from benefiting from the jointly owned trust assets, and in 2011, filed an accounting in a New York court to "cash out" Sky from the holdings.  An article about the dispute was published in Vanity Fair

Wasserstein's political position was liberal. He was involved with media since high school and college, when he was an editor on his high school newspaper, The McBurneian Bruce Wasserstein’s Westport Connection - WestportNow.com - Westport, Connecticut, (McBurney School, New York), and later at the University of Michigan Michigan Daily, then served an internship at Forbes magazine. Inspired by Ralph Nader, he was one of "Nader's Raiders" for a brief length of time. Rahm Emanuel and Vernon Jordan were employed by Wasserstein for a few years. Wasserstein also served as trustee for the Columbia University Graduate School of Journalism from 2001 until his death.

Death
On October 11, 2009, Wasserstein was admitted to hospital with an irregular heartbeat. It was originally reported that his condition was serious, but that he was stable and recovering. However, Wasserstein died in Manhattan three days later, on October 14, at the age of 61.

Books
 
 
 
 

References

External links
 "Wasserstein Haunts Harry & David in Buyout Doomed to Bankruptcy..."
 "King of the Barbarians arrives at the Pearly Gates"
 New York Daily News obituary
 "Bruce Wasserstein dies at 61"
 Wasserstein & Co. site
 Wasserstein was editor on high school newspaper The McBurneian
 Daily Telegraph obituary
 Wasserstein went from Nader acolyte to Wall Street legend in the Harvard Law Record''

1947 births
2009 deaths
20th-century American businesspeople
20th-century American philanthropists
21st-century American businesspeople
21st-century philanthropists
American billionaires
American business writers
American chief executives of financial services companies
American economics writers
American finance and investment writers
American financiers
American investment bankers
American legal writers
American male non-fiction writers
American money managers
American people of Polish-Jewish descent
Businesspeople from New York City
Cravath, Swaine & Moore people
Harvard Business School alumni
Harvard Law School alumni
Jewish American philanthropists
Jewish American writers
People from Midwood, Brooklyn
Philanthropists from New York (state)
Private equity and venture capital investors
The Michigan Daily alumni
University of Michigan alumni
Writers from Brooklyn
20th-century American male writers
20th-century American Jews
21st-century American Jews